The borders of Malaysia include land and maritime borders with Brunei, Indonesia and Thailand and shared maritime boundaries with Philippines, Singapore and Vietnam.

Land borders
Malaysia has a total land border length of 3,147.3 km

Brunei
Malaysia's border with Brunei is 481.3 km in length. Except for its coastline with the South China Sea, Brunei is completely surrounded by Malaysia's state of Sarawak on the island of Borneo.

Indonesia
Malaysia shares a land border with Indonesia on the island of Borneo. The Malaysian states of Sabah and Sarawak lie to the north of the border while the Indonesian provinces of North Kalimantan, East Kalimantan, and West Kalimantan lie to the south. The length of the border is 2,019.5 km.

Thailand
Malaysia's border with Thailand is located to the north of Peninsula Malaysia and runs between the Straits of Malacca on the west and the Gulf of Thailand/South China Sea in the east. The Malaysian states of Kedah, Kelantan, Perak and Perlis border the Thai provinces of Narathiwat, Satun, Songkhla and Yala. The border length is 646.5 km.

Maritime borders

Malaysia has common maritime boundaries with Brunei, Indonesia, the Philippines, Singapore, Thailand and Vietnam. Part of its maritime borders have been delimited through agreements with neighbouring countries. Malaysia has agreements to delimit the continental shelf, territorial sea and other border delimitation agreements or treaties with Indonesia, the Philippines, Thailand and Singapore.

Malaysia has also unilaterally declared its maritime boundaries through a 1979 map published by its Department of Mapping and Survey. The continental shelf and territorial sea limits depicted on the 1979 map have not been recognised by Malaysia's neighbouring states and have been the subject of maritime boundary and territorial disputes.

Malaysia has signed joint development agreements for areas which are subject to overlapping claims with Thailand and Vietnam. Malaysia has signed a Letters of Exchange with Brunei in 2009 to solve the dispute of maritime territories between the two countries. The boundaries between the two countries currently follow those determined through pre-independence British Orders in Council.

Peninsula Malaysia
The coordinates for the continental shelf and territorial sea limits of Peninsula Malaysia are in the chart below. Territorial waters off the coast of Peninsula Malaysia border Thailand to the north in the Straits of Malacca and South China Sea/Gulf of Thailand; Indonesia to the west in the Straits of Malacca and south east in the South China Sea; and Vietnam in the north east in the South China Sea.

Sabah and Sarawak
Malaysia's continental shelf off the coast of its Borneo states of Sabah and Sarawak cover the South China Sea and Sulu Sea to the north, and Celebes Sea to the east. Territorial waters border Indonesia to the east and west, the Philippines to the northeast, and Vietnam to the north.

Only a portion of the border is delimited through agreements. The bulk of the border is the result of the unilateral declaration by Malaysia through its 1979 map and the border is subject to dispute, including most of the border in the South China Sea which covers parts of the Spratly Islands.

Disputes
Outside the border defined by a 1995 agreement, there is still no formal agreement between Malaysia and Singapore to delimit their common borders and this has resulted in several overlapping claims. Singapore claims a three-nautical-mile (6 km) territorial sea limit, while Malaysia claims a  territorial sea limit.

Following the International Court of Justice decision on 23 May 2008 on the sovereignty of Pedra Branca which gave the island to Singapore, the new portion of the Malaysia-Singapore maritime border around the island will also need to be determined.

There is also a dispute involving the alleged incursion into Malaysian territorial waters by land reclamation works by Singapore at the western entrance to the Straits of Johor.

References